Kate Darby (born 18 November 1990) is an Australian rules footballer who played for the Carlton Football Club in the AFL Women's competition (AFLW). She was drafted by Carlton with the club's sixteenth selection and the one hundred and twenty sixth overall in the 2016 AFL Women's draft. She made her debut in round 2, 2017, in a match against  at Ikon Park. She was dropped from the team the following week however and would not return until the final match of the season in round 7. She was subsequently delisted at season's end.

In May 2018 Darby accepted an offer from expansion club Geelong to play with the club in the 2019 AFLW season. In June 2021, she was delisted by Geelong.

In December 2021, Darby returned to the Geelong AFLW squad as a replacement player for Renee Garing. Darby was awarded the Hoops Award at the 2022 Geelong AFLW awards. The Hoops Award is awarded to the player making the best values based contribution to the club, and voted on by players, AFLW staff and coaches.

References

External links

Living people
1990 births
Carlton Football Club (AFLW) players
Australian rules footballers from Victoria (Australia)
Sportswomen from Victoria (Australia)
Geelong Football Club (AFLW) players